The National Academies of Sciences, Engineering, and Medicine (also known as NASEM or the National Academies) are the collective scientific national academy of the United States. The name is used interchangeably in two senses: (1) as an umbrella term for its three quasi-independent honorific member organizations the National Academy of Sciences (NAS), the National Academy of Engineering (NAE), and the National Academy of Medicine (NAM); and (2) as the brand for studies and reports issued by the operating arm of the three academies, the National Research Council (NRC). The NRC was first formed in 1916 as an activity of the NAS. 

Now jointly governed by all three academies, the NRC produces some 200 publications annually which are published by the National Academies Press. The reports produced by the National Academies have been characterized as reflective of scientific consensus.

History
The US National Academy of Sciences was created by an Act of Incorporation dated March 3, 1863, which was signed by then President of the United States, Abraham Lincoln. The Act stated that "... the Academy shall, whenever called upon by any department of the Government, investigate, examine, experiment, and report upon any subject of science or art. ... " With the American civil war raging, the new Academy was presented with few problems to solve, but it did address matters of "... coinage, weights and measures, iron ship hulls, and the purity of whiskey ..."
All subsequently affiliated organizations have been created under this same overall congressional charter, including the two younger academies, National Academy of Engineering (NAE) (created in 1964) and NAM (created as the Institute of Medicine in 1970 and rechartered as NAM in 2015).

Under this same charter, the National Research Council was created in 1916. On June 19 of that year, then US President Woodrow Wilson requested that the National Academy of Sciences organize a "National Research Council". The purpose of the Council (at first called the National Research Foundation) was in part to foster and encourage "the increased use of scientific research in the development of American industries ... the employment of scientific methods in strengthening the national defense ... and such other applications of science as will promote the national security and welfare."

At the time, the Academy's effort to support national defense readiness, the Committee on Nitric Acid Supply, was approved by Secretary of War Newton D. Baker. Nitric acid was the substance basic in the making of propellants such as cordite, high explosives, dyes, fertilizers, and other products but availability was limited due to World War I. The NRC, through its committee, recommended importing Chilean saltpeter and the construction of four new ordnance plants. These recommendations were accepted by the War Department in June 1917, although the plants were not completed prior to the end of the war.  
In 1918, Wilson formalized the NRC's existence under Executive Order 2859. Wilson's order declared the function of the NRC to be in general:
"(T)o stimulate research in the mathematical. physical, and biological sciences. and in the application of these sciences to engineering, agriculture. medicine. and other useful arts. with the object of increasing knowledge, of strengthening the national defense, and of contributing in other ways to the public welfare."
During World War I, the United States was at war, the NRC operated as the Department of Science and Research of the Council of National Defense as well as the Science and Research Division of the United States Army Signal Corps. When war was first declared, the Council had organized committees on anti-submarine and gas warfare.

On June 1, 1917, the council convened a meeting of scientific representatives of the United Kingdom and France with interested parties from the U.S. on the subject of submarine detection. Another meeting with the British and French was held in Paris in October 1918, at which more details of their work was disclosed. As a result of these meetings, the NRC recommended that scientists be brought together to work on the problems associated with submarine detection. Due to the success of council-directed research in producing a sound-based method of detecting submarines, as well as other military innovations, the NRC was retained at the end of the war, though it was gradually decoupled from the military.

NRC's Articles of Organization have been changed only three times: in 1956, January 1993, and July 2015.

The Academies

The National Academy of Sciences, National Academy of Engineering, and National Academy of Medicine are honorary membership organizations, each of which has its own governing Council, and each of which elects its own new members. The membership
of the three academies totals more than 6,300 scientists, engineers, and health professionals. New members for each organization are elected annually by current members, based on their distinguished and continuing achievements in original research. By the terms of the original 1863 Congressional charter, the three academies serve pro bono as "advisers to the nation on science, engineering, and medicine."

Program units
The program units, formerly known as the National Research Council, are collectively the operating arm of the three academies for the purpose of providing objective policy advice. Although separately chartered (see above), it falls legally under the overall charter of the National Academy of Sciences, whose ultimate fiduciary body is the NAS Council. In actual practice, the NAS Council delegates governing authority to a Governing Board of the National Research Council that is chaired jointly by the presidents of the three academies, with additional members chosen by them or specified in the charters of the academies.

Under this three-academy umbrella, the program units produce reports that shape policies, inform public opinion, and advance the pursuit of science, engineering, and medicine.

There are seven major divisions: Division of Behavioral and Social Sciences and Education, Division of Earth and Life Studies, Division of Engineering and Physical Sciences, Health and Medicine Division, Policy and Global Affairs Division, Transportation Research Board, and the Gulf Research Program.

Division of Behavioral and Social Sciences and Education (DBASSE)

Units of the Division of Behavioral and Social Sciences and Education

Board on Children, Youth, and Families (BCYF)
Board on Behavioral, Cognitive, and Sensory Sciences (BBCSS)
Board on Human-Systems Integration (BOHSI)
Board on Environmental Change and Society (BECS)
Board on Science Education (BOSE)
Committee on Law and Justice (CLAJ)
Board on Testing and Assessment (BOTA)
Committee on Population (CPOP)
Committee on National Statistics (CNSTAT)

Division on Earth and Life Studies (DELS)

Units of the Division on Earth and Life Studies

Board on Agriculture and Natural Resources (BANR)
Board on Atmospheric Sciences and Climate (BASC)
Board on Chemical Sciences and Technology (BCST)
Board on Earth Sciences and Resources (BESR)
Board on Environmental Studies and Toxicology (BEST)
Board on Life Sciences (BLS)
Institute for Laboratory Animal Research (ILAR)
Nuclear and Radiation Studies Board (NRSB)
Ocean Studies Board (OSB)
Polar Research Board (PRB)
Water Science and Technology Board (WSTB)

Division on Engineering and Physical Sciences (DEPS)
The Division on Engineering and Physical Sciences has activities organized around: 
Government missions in defense, space, and aerospace
National infrastructure challenges such as energy and environmental systems, information and telecommunications, manufacturing and engineering design, civil engineering, and the built or constructed environment inclusive of its Board on Infrastructure and Constructed Environment or BICE
Science and engineering disciplines such as physics, astronomy, computer science and engineering, materials science and engineering, and the mathematical sciences and their applications.
Continuing assessments of federal government laboratories and research programs.

Units of the Division on Engineering and Physical Sciences

Aeronautics and Space Engineering Board (ASEB)
Air Force Studies Board (AFSB)
Board on Army Research and Development (BOARD)
Board on Energy and Environmental Systems (BEES)
Board on Infrastructure and the Constructed Environment (BICE)
Board on Mathematical Sciences and Analytics (BMSA)
Board on Physics and Astronomy (BPA)
Computer Science and Telecommunications Board (CSTB)
Intelligence Community Studies Board (ICSB)
Laboratory Assessments Board (LAB)
National Materials and Manufacturing Board (NMMB)
Naval Studies Board (NSB)
Space Studies Board (SSB)

Gulf Research Program (GRP)

Health and Medicine Division (HMD)

Units of the Health and Medicine Division

Board on Children, Youth, and Families (BCYF)
Board on Global Health (BGH)
Board on Health Care Services (HCS)
Board on Health Sciences Policy (HSP)
Board on Population Health and Public Health Practice (BPH)
Food and Nutrition Board (FNB)

Policy and Global Affairs Division (PGA)

Units of the Policy and Global Affairs Division

Board on Higher Education and Workforce (BHEW)
Board on International Scientific Organizations (BISO)
Board on Research Data and Information (BRDI)
Board on Science, Technology, and Economic Policy (STEP)
Committee on Human Rights (CHR)
Committee on International Security and Arms Control (CISAC)
Committee on Science, Engineering, Medicine, and Public Policy (COSEMPUP)
Committee on Science, Technology, and Law (CSTL)
Committee on Women in Science, Engineering, and Medicine (CWSEM)
Fellowships Office
Government-University-Industry Research Roundtable (GUIRR)
Resilient America Program 
Science and Technology for Sustainability (STS)

Transportation Research Board (TRB)

Units of the Transportation Research Board

Consensus and Advisory Studies Division
Cooperative Research Programs Division
Airport Cooperative Research Program (ACRP)
National Cooperative Highway Research Program (NCHRP)
Behavioral Traffic Safety Cooperative Research Program (BTSCRP)
National Cooperative Research and Evaluation Program (NCREP)
Transit Cooperative Research Program (TCRP)
National Cooperative Freight Research Program (NCFRP)
National Cooperative Rail Research Program (NCRRP)
Hazardous Materials Cooperative Research Program (HMCRP)

The study process
The National Academies attempt to obtain authoritative, objective, and scientifically balanced answers to difficult questions of national importance. Top scientists, engineers, health professionals, and other experts (not limited to those in academies membership) are enlisted to address the scientific and technical aspects of some of society's problems. These experts are volunteers who serve on study committees that are convened to answer specific sets of questions. All committee members serve without pay. NASEM itself does not perform original research; rather it provides independent advice. Federal agencies are the primary financial sponsors of the Academies' work; additional studies are funded by state agencies, foundations, other private sponsors, and the National Academies endowment. The external sponsors have no control over the conduct or results of a study, once the statement of task and budget are finalized. Study committees gather information from many sources in public meetings but deliberate in private in order to avoid political, special interest, and sponsor influence.

All reports go through an extensive external review facilitated by the internal Report Review Committee (also consisting of members from the NAS, NAE, and NAM).

Through this study process, the National Academies produce around 200 reports each year. Recent reports cover such topics as addressing the obesity epidemic, the use of forensics in the courtroom, invasive plants, pollinator collapse, underage drinking, the Hubble Telescope, vaccine safety, the hydrogen economy, transportation safety, climate change, and homeland security. Many reports influence policy decisions; some are instrumental in enabling new research programs; others provide independent program reviews. The National Academies Press is the publisher for the National Academies of Sciences, Engineering, and Medicine, and makes its publications available for free online reading, and the full book PDFs have been available for free download since 2011.

Notable reports

Reports on climate change
In 2001, the NRC published the report Climate Change Science: An Analysis of Some Key Questions, which emphasized the fact that national policy decisions made now and in the long-term future will influence the extent of any damage suffered by vulnerable human populations and ecosystems later in this century. The report endorsed findings of the Intergovernmental Panel on Climate Change (IPCC) as representing the views of the scientific community:

The changes observed over the last several decades are likely mostly due to human activities, but we cannot rule out that some significant part of these changes is also a reflection of natural variability. Human-induced warming and associated sea level rise are expected to continue through the 21st century ... The IPCC's conclusion that most of the observed warming of the last 50 years is likely to have been due to the increase in greenhouse gas concentrations accurately reflects the current thinking of the scientific community on this issue.

In 2013, the NRC published the report Abrupt Impacts of Climate Change: Anticipating Surprises, which provided an updated look at the issue of abrupt climate change and its potential impacts. This study differed from previous treatments of abrupt changes by focusing on abrupt climate changes and also abrupt climate impacts that have the potential to severely affect the physical climate system, natural systems, or human systems, often affecting multiple interconnected areas of concern.

Report on sexual assault
In 2013, the NRC published the report Estimating the Incidence of Rape and Sexual Assault, which pointed out that approximately 80 percent of sexual assaults go unreported to law enforcement. The report recommends that the National Crime Victimization Survey adopt new approaches to interviews of rape victims, including changing the wording of questions.

In an article about the report, Amber Stevenson, clinical supervisor and therapist at the Nashville Sexual Assault Center, said that victim-blaming was the main issue preventing victims from coming forward: As long as we as a community continue to make victim-blaming statements, such as, "She put herself in this situation,"..."She didn't fight back, she must have wanted it," we will continue to see rapes go unreported ... We have to stop blaming the victim. The conversation needs to shift to the person who chose to rape.

Report on integrity in research
The 1992 report, Responsible Science: Ensuring the Integrity of the Research Process was updated in 2017 by the report, Fostering Integrity in Research:

 ... as experience has accumulated with various forms of research misconduct, detrimental research practices, and other forms of misconduct, as subsequent empirical research has revealed more about the nature of scientific misconduct, and because technological and social changes have altered the environment in which science is conducted, it is clear that the framework established more than two decades ago needs to be updated.

One of the report's main concerns is that a growing percentage of recently published research turns out to be not reproducible due in part to inadequate support of standards of transparency in many fields as well as to various other detrimental research practices.

Other programs
The Christine Mirzayan Science and Technology Policy Fellowship is an annual program for current or recent graduate students to spend three months working in the National Academies. The Academies also administered the Marian Koshland Science Museum in downtown Washington until its closing in 2017; the Museum has since been replaced by LabX, a program of online resources and nationwide public events that aim to increase awareness of scientific and evidence-based solutions to community problems.

Revenue
The National Academies do not receive direct appropriations from the federal government, instead their revenue comes from grants and contracts of Federal agencies and private sources.

See also
American Academy of Arts and Sciences
List of members of the National Academy of Sciences
Member of the National Academy of Sciences
National Academies Press
United States National Research Council rankings

References

Further reading

External links

National Academy of Sciences (NAS)
National Academy of Engineering (NAE)
National Academy of Medicine (NAM)
National Academies Press (NAP)
Division on Engineering and Physical Sciences

 
Corporations chartered by the United States Congress
National academies
United States
Scientific organizations based in the United States
Research councils
Judiciary Square